is a volcano located on the Shiretoko Peninsula in Hokkaido, northeastern Japan.

References

Mountains of Hokkaido
Volcanoes of Hokkaido
Stratovolcanoes of Japan
Pleistocene stratovolcanoes